Fominskaya is a rural locality (a village) in Moseyevskoye Rural Settlement, Totemsky District, Vologda Oblast, Russia. The population was 24 as of 2002.

Geography 
Fominskaya is located 36 km northwest of Totma (the district's administrative centre) by road. Kozhinskaya is the nearest rural locality.

References 

Rural localities in Totemsky District